This is the US Eighth Army order of battle during the Korean War.

 US Eighth Army
  US I Corps 13 September 1950-End of war
  US 1st Cavalry Division 13 September 1950-January 1951; April 1951-December 1951
  US 2nd Infantry Division 23 July 1950-End of war
  US 3rd Infantry Division January 1951-; -11 July 1952; -January 1953
  US 7th Infantry Division January 1953-End of war
  US 24th Infantry Division 13 September 1950-January 1951; -January 1953
  US 25th Infantry Division January 1951-March 1952; January 1953-
  US 45th Infantry Division December 1951-January 1953
  US 1st Marine Division January 1953-End of war
  British 27th Infantry Brigade 13 September 1950-January 1951
  British 1st Commonwealth Division March 1952-January 1953
  ROK 1st Infantry Division 13 September 1950-April 1951; March 1952-End of war
  ROK 2nd Infantry Division January 1953-End of war
  ROK 8th Infantry Division March 1952-January 1953
  ROK 9th Infantry Division March 1952-January 1953
  ROK 25th Infantry Division January 1953-End of war
  US IX Corps 23 September 1950-End of war
  5th Regimental Combat Team January 1952-
  US 187th Regimental Combat Team January 1951-March 1951
  US 1st Cavalry Division January 1951-January 1952
  US 2nd Infantry Division 23 September 1950 -January 1951; March 1952-January 1953
  US 3rd Infantry Division -End of war
  US 7th Infantry Division March 1951-January 1953
  US 24th Infantry Division January 1951-January 1952
  US 25th Infantry Division 23 September 1950-January 1951
  US 40th Infantry Division March 1952-January 1953
  US 45th Infantry Division January 1952-March 1952
  US 1st Marine Division January 1951-March 1951
  British 27th Infantry Brigade 17 February 1951-
  ROK Capital Division March 1952-End of war
  ROK 2nd Infantry Division March 1951-January 1952; March 1952-January 1953
  ROK 3rd Infantry Division March 1952-January 1953
  ROK 6th Infantry Division January 1951-January 1952
  ROK 9th Infantry Division January 1953-End of war
  US X Corps  15 September 1950-End of war
  US 2nd Infantry Division April 1951-March 1952
  US 3rd Infantry Division 24 December 1950-April 1951
  US 7th Infantry Division 15 September 1950-April 1951
  US 25th Infantry Division March 1952-January 1953
  US 40th Infantry Division January 1953-End of war
  US 45th Infantry Division January 1953-End of war
  US 1st Marine Division 15 September 1950-December 1950; -January 1953
  ROK 2nd Infantry Division October 1950-March 1952
  ROK 5th Infantry Division October 1950-April 1951
  ROK 6th Infantry Division March 1952-January 1953
  ROK 7th Infantry Division April 1951-End of war
  ROK 8th Infantry Division October 1950-April 1951; -March 1952
  ROK 12th Infantry Division January 1953-End of war
  ROK 20th Infantry Division January 1953-End of war

Korean War orders of battle